Marvin Javier Bernárdez García (born 5 February 1995) is a Honduran professional footballer who plays as a winger for Vida in the Liga Nacional de Fútbol Profesional de Honduras.

References

External links
 

1995 births
Living people
Association football wingers
Honduran footballers
C.D.S. Vida players
People from La Ceiba
C.D. Olimpia players